Port Adelaide is the port of the South Australian capital of Adelaide. 

It may also refer to:

Division of Port Adelaide - an electorate for the Australian House of Representatives
Electoral district of Port Adelaide - an electorate for the South Australian House of Assembly
Hundred of Port Adelaide, a cadastral unit
Port Adelaide Football Club - a club that competes in the Australian Football League (AFL) and the South Australian National Football League (SANFL)
Port Adelaide Lighthouse, a decommissioned lighthouse
Port Adelaide railway station
Port Adelaide River, the official name for the Port River
Port Adelaide Workers Memorial

See also